Even My Sure Things Fall Through is an EP by Arizona band Calexico.

Track listing
 "Sonic Wind" (Instrumental mix)   
 "Crystal Frontier" (Widescreen version)  
 "Untitled III" (Two Loneswordsmen remix)
 "Chanel #5"
 "Banderilla"
 "Crooked Road and the Briar"
 "Crystal Frontier" (Acoustic version)	 
 "Hard Hat" (remix)

Calexico (band) EPs
2001 EPs